Fragile or The Fragile may refer to:

Film and television
 Fragile (film), a 2005 film by Jaume Balagueró
 "Fragile" (Smallville), a television episode

Literature
 Fragile (manga), a 2016 Japanese series by Bin Kusamizu and Saburō Megumi
 Fragile (novel), a 2010 novel by Lisa Unger
 Fragile, a 2003–2004 comics series by Stefano Raffaele

Music
 Fragile Records, an American record label

Albums
 Fragile (Cherrelle album), 1984
 Fragile (Dead or Alive album), 2000
 Fragile (Junko Onishi album), 1998
 Fragile (Midge Ure album) or the title song, 2014
 Fragile (Yes album), 1971
 Fragile, by Saron Gas, now known as Seether, 2000
 The Fragile or the title song, by Nine Inch Nails, 1999
 The Fragile (O'Hooley & Tidow album), 2012

Songs
 "Fragile" (Every Little Thing song), 2001
 "Fragile" (Kygo and Labrinth song), 2016
 "Fragile" (Namewee song), 2021
 "Fragile" (Sting song), 1988
 "Fragile" (Tech N9ne song), 2013
 "Fragile", by God Is an Astronaut from All Is Violent, All Is Bright, 2005
 "Fragile", by Kerli from Love Is Dead, 2008
 "Fragile", by Kygo from Cloud Nine, 2016
 "Fragile", by Kylie Minogue from Fever, 2001
 "Fragile", by Lacuna Coil from Karmacode, 2006
 "Fragile", by Prince Fox, 2016
 "Fragile", by Paul Rodgers from Cut Loose, 1983
 "Fragile", by Sentenced from Crimson, 2000

Other uses
 Fragile: Farewell Ruins of the Moon, a 2009 video game by Namco Bandai
 Fragile, a women's fragrance by Jean Paul Gaultier

See also
 Brittleness
 Software brittleness
 
 
 Fragility (disambiguation)